The Polar Bear is a 1998 German action film directed by Til Schweiger.

Cast 
 Til Schweiger - Leo
 Karina Krawczyk - Nico
 Benno Fürmann - Fabian
 Florian Lukas - Reza
  - Thomas
  - Manni
 Thierry Van Werveke - Norbert
  - Boris
  - Zivilpolizist
 Ralf Richter - Zivilpolizist
 Leonard Lansink - Barkeeper "Paul's Eck"
 Leander Haußmann - Stephan
 August Schmölzer - Heinz
 Heiner Lauterbach - Gesundheitsinspektor
 Katharina Thalbach - Hilde
 Tom Gerhardt - Manager "American Diner"
 Peter Maffay - Alex

References

External links 

1998 films
1990s crime action films
German crime action films
Films based on works by Haruki Murakami
Films directed by Til Schweiger
1990s German films